Times Broadcasting Network Corporation is a Philippine radio network. Its main headquarters is located at the 2nd Floor, Paguito Yu Bldg., Mabini Ext., Brgy. Carmen Annex, Ozamiz. TBNC operates a number of stations across places in Northwestern Mindanao and some parts of Central Visayas under the Radyo BisDak branding.

Profile
Times Broadcasting Network Corporation was found in the 1970s by Emilio Sy with DXSY. In 1990, it expanded into FM, with its stations in Ozamiz, Dipolog and Pagadian carrying a Top 40 format with unique branding for each. In 2010, after the death of Alex Velayo Sy, its stations started losing steam. In 2016, Bisdak Media Group acquired the company and rebranded its stations as Radyo BisDak, which since carry a music and news format. It also opened a few more stations in Zamboanga and Central Visayas.

TBNC Stations

AM Stations

Radyo Bisdak

References

Radio stations in the Philippines
Philippine radio networks